The 2004 Orlando mayoral election was held on Tuesday, March 9, 2004, to elect the mayor of Orlando, Florida.  Incumbent mayor Buddy Dyer was elected to a first full term.

Municipal elections in Orlando and Orange County are non-partisan.  Had no candidate received a majority of the votes in the general election, a runoff would have been held between the two candidates that received the greatest number of votes.

Results

References

2004
2004 Florida elections
2004 United States mayoral elections
2000s in Orlando, Florida